Astoria is a grand houseboat, built in 1911 for impresario Fred Karno and adapted as a recording studio in the 1980s by its new owner, Pink Floyd guitarist David Gilmour. It is moored on the River Thames at Hampton in the London Borough of Richmond upon Thames. Gilmour purchased the boat in 1986, because he "spent half of [his] life in recording studios with no windows, no light, but on the boat there are many windows, with beautiful scenery on the outside".

Early history 
The boat was built in 1911 for impresario Fred Karno who wanted to have the best houseboat on the river permanently moored alongside his hotel, the Karsino at Tagg's Island. He designed it so that an entire 90-piece orchestra could play on deck.

The boat is framed in mahogany and has mainly Crittall windows with taller, wider windows towards one end.  It is topped by very ornate metalwork canopies and balustrades.

Gilmour era 

Gilmour bought the boat after seeing it advertised for sale in a copy of Country Life magazine in his dentist's waiting room, just a short while after admiring it while being driven past its moorings.

Parts of each of the last three Pink Floyd studio albums, A Momentary Lapse of Reason (1987), The Division Bell (1994), and The Endless River (2014), were recorded on the boat, as were parts of Gilmour's solo album On an Island (2006). His most recent solo studio album, Rattle That Lock (2015), was mixed and partially recorded there. It was also used for mixing the Pink Floyd live album Pulse (1995) as well as the Pulse film (1995), Gilmour's Remember That Night DVD/Blu-ray (2007) and his Live in Gdańsk (2008) live album/DVD.

Bob Ezrin has mentioned, however, that the floating studio posed a few problems when it came to engineering guitar sounds for A Momentary Lapse of Reason:

A video of longtime Pink Floyd recording engineer Andrew Jackson, sitting at the mixing console of the Astoria Studio, is available online.

Numerous photographs taken in 1993 of the band recording The Division Bell on board the Astoria appear on the sleeve of the 2014 Pink Floyd album, The Endless River.

Footage 
Dara Ó Briain, Griff Rhys Jones and Rory McGrath visited the floating studio/house while rowing up the Thames for the BBC television programme Three Men in a Boat.

Gilmour's rendition of William Shakespeare's Sonnet 18 ("Shall I compare thee to a summer’s day?"), set to piano, was also filmed on the Astoria.

Equipment 

According to an interview with Phil Taylor (Gilmour's guitar technician), the studio on the Astoria was originally equipped with a DDA AMR 24 mixer console and UREI 813 studio main monitors with Phase Linear amps. The UREI 813s were replaced around 1990 by ATC main monitors. Customised ATC SCM150ASL active speakers are used for the main left and right channels with a standard ATC SCM150ASL active speaker used as the centre channel. The centre channel sits above an ATC SCM0.1–15 subwoofer. The surround monitors are two ATC SCM50ASLs. A variety of near-field monitor speakers are used including Yamaha NS-10s and Auratones depending on who happens to be working at the studio. The acoustic design was done with the assistance of Nick Whitaker, an independent acoustician, and much of the equipment was recommended by James Guthrie and Andrew Jackson. Nowadays the Astoria has a Neve 88R mixing console, as well as three Studer A827 multi-tracks and Ampex ATR-100 tape recorders, which were modified by Tim de Paravicini, Esoteric Audio Research's (EAR) founder. The conversion to a studio also required 14 miles (23 km) of cables, which were sourced from Van den Hul cables of the Netherlands. There are various compressors from Pye and EAR 660 tube designs, as well as EAR 825s for EQ.

See also
 Garrick's Temple to Shakespeare (neighbour)

References 

1911 establishments in England
1911 ships
Buildings and structures on the River Thames
David Gilmour
Hampton, London
Houseboats
Pink Floyd
Recording studios in London